Clipmapping is a method of clipping a mipmap to a subset of data pertinent to the geometry being displayed. This is useful for loading as little data as possible when memory is limited, such as on a graphics processing unit. The technique is used for LODing in NVIDIA’s implementation of voxel cone tracing. The high-resolution levels of the mipmapped scene representation are clipped to a region near the camera while lower resolution levels are clipped further away.

References

External links 
 SGI paper from 1998
 SGI paper from 1996
 Description from SGI's developer library

Clipping (computer graphics)